Alan Brounell Somers (born July 30, 1941) is an American former competition swimmer and world record-holder who represented the United States at the 1960 Summer Olympics in Rome  Somers competed in the men's 400-meter freestyle, finishing fifth in the event final with a time of 4:22.0.  He also qualified for the final of the men's 1,500-meter freestyle, clocked a time of 18:02.8 and finished seventh overall.

Somers was a member of a U.S. team that set a new world record of 8:17.0 in the 4×200-meter freestyle relay on July 23, 1960; the record was broken by an Australian relay team less than a month later.

Somers attended Indiana University, where he swam for coach Doc Counsilman's Indiana Hoosiers swimming and diving team in National Collegiate Athletic Association (NCAA) competition.  He received eight All-American honors as a college athlete, and won three Big Ten Conference individual championships in the 1,500-meter (1961, 1962) and 1,650-yard (1963) freestyle events.

He graduated from Indiana University School of Medicine in 1968 and specialized in neurology.

See also
 List of Indiana University (Bloomington) people
 World record progression 4 × 200 metres freestyle relay

References

External links
 

1941 births
Living people
American male freestyle swimmers
World record setters in swimming
Indiana Hoosiers men's swimmers
Olympic swimmers of the United States
Swimmers from Indianapolis
Swimmers at the 1959 Pan American Games
Swimmers at the 1960 Summer Olympics
Pan American Games gold medalists for the United States
Pan American Games medalists in swimming
Medalists at the 1959 Pan American Games